Łukasz Rutkowski (born 22 January 1988 in Zakopane) is a Polish ski jumper.

Personal life
Łukasz Rutkowski was born in Zakopane, Poland. He has an older brother Mateusz, who is a ski jumper too.

Career
He made his Continental Cup debut in February 2006, his best result being a sixth place from Vikersund in March 2008. He also finished seventh in the normal hill at both the 2006 and 2008 Junior World Championships; at the latter event he also won a bronze medal in the team competition. He made his World Cup debut in January 2008 in Zakopane, and collected his first World Cup points with a 27th place in December 2008 in Engelberg. His best result is a 24th place in January 2009 in Zakopane. At the FIS Nordic World Ski Championships 2009 in Liberec, he finished fourth in the team large hill event. Rutkowski finished sixth in the team large hill event at the 2010 Winter Olympics in Vancouver.

References

1988 births
Living people
Olympic ski jumpers of Poland
Polish male ski jumpers
Sportspeople from Zakopane
Ski jumpers at the 2010 Winter Olympics
21st-century Polish people